The Banking, Insurance and Finance Union (BIFU) was a British trade union.

The union was founded in 1946 as the National Union of Bank Employees (NUBE), when the Bank Officers' Guild and the Scottish Bankers' Association merged.  In 1979, it was renamed the Banking, Insurance and Finance Union.  In 1999, it merged with the NatWest Staff Association and the Barclays Group Staff Union to form UNIFI.

By the time of its merger, the union had 113,000 members, in national and international banks, the Bank of England, insurance companies, building societies, finance houses and the Financial Services Authority.  It was affiliated to the Trades Union Congress.

General Secretaries
1946: T. G. Edwards
1959: James Hornby
1963: Alfred Brooks
1972: Leif Mills
1996: Ed Sweeney

References

External links
Catalogue of the BIFU archives, held at the Modern Records Centre, University of Warwick
Catalogue of the BOG archives, held at the Modern Records Centre, University of Warwick

Trade unions established in 1946
Finance sector trade unions
Defunct trade unions of the United Kingdom
Trade unions disestablished in 1999
1946 establishments in the United Kingdom